Albertas Goštautas (Belarusian/Ukrainian: Альберт Гаштольд) ( – 1539) was a Lithuanian noble of the Goštautai family from ethnic Lithuanian lands of the Grand Duchy of Lithuania. Voivode of Navahrudak since 1508, Voivode of Polotsk since 1514, Voivode of Trakai since 1519 and Voivode of Vilnius since 1522. In 1522 he became Grand Chancellor of Lithuania. He was the initiator and the editor of the First Statute of Lithuania, as a successor of his staunch opponent Mikolaj Radziwiłł, who rivaled him in the precedence in the Council of Lords. His subsequent rival in influence in the Grand Duchy was Konstanty Ostrogski.

Albertas was a son of Martynas Goštautas and father of Stanislovas Goštautas, last male heir of the Goštautai family. He was buried in Vilnius Cathedral, where his tomb remains till present day. He built the Hieraniony Castle (ruins survive in present-day Belarus).

It is thought that Albertas Goštautas, as well as the rest of Goštautai family members, had retained their native Lithuanian language. Influenced by the ideas of the Protestant Reformation, Goštautas was a supporter of the Lithuanian culture and language in state affairs and had a nationalistic attitude: he segregated non-Lithuanian and Polish-speaking Franciscans, took care of the representatives of Lithuanian literature, such as Abraomas Kulvietis, and showed distrust to Ruthenian inhabitants of the Grand Duchy.

He is one of the characters on the famous painting by Jan Matejko, Prussian Homage.

References

1480s births
1539 deaths
Politicians from Vilnius
Burials at Vilnius Cathedral
Counts of the Holy Roman Empire
Albertas
Grand Chancellors of the Grand Duchy of Lithuania
Voivodes of Trakai